Roman Polianskyi (born September 1, 1986) is a Ukrainian para-rower. He is the 2016 and 2020 Summer Paralympics gold medalist in men's single sculls.

Early life
Polianskyi is originally from the village Khanzhenkovo near Makiivka in the Donetsk Province of Ukraine. He started doing sports at the age of four, at the urging of his father. Polianskyi started experiencing symptoms of Strumpell disease at the age of ten.  He moved to Odessa in spring 2014, at the start of the 2014 pro-Russian unrest in Ukraine.

Polianskyi was training in rowing for two years prior to the 2016 Rio Paralymic Games. During that time he trained with coach Yuri Bondarenko in Dnipro.

When Polianskyi was 18, his father died from a mining accident; his mother died two years later. Polianskyi has a younger sister.

Polianskyi now uses a wheelchair.

Athletic career
Initially Polianskyi competed in para-canoeing but switched to para-rowing once canoeing was not included in the Rio 2016 Summer Paralympics program. Polianskyi competes in men's PR1 single sculls in para-rowing events. 
The PR1 classification designates those para-rowing athletes who compete while mainly using their arms and shoulders.

Polianskyi has the medical condition called hereditary spastic paraplegia. The condition is also known as Strumpell disease.

Polianskyi's first para-rowing sports race was in 2014 in Gavirate, Italy, where he came fourth.

He won the gold medal in men's single sculls at the 2016 Summer Paralympics in Rio de Janeiro. In the final race Polianskyi came ahead of the world champion, Erik Horrie of Australia, and the 2008 Paralympic champion, Tom Aggar of Great Britain. In that race Polianskyi also set a new Paralympic record, with the time of 04:39.56.

Polianskyi won the silver medal in men's PR1 single sculls at the 2017 World Rowing Championships at Sarasota and also the 2018 World Rowing Championships in Plovdiv.

He won the gold medal in the same discipline at the 2019 World Rowing Championships in Linz Ottensheim. There he also set the new world record in PR1 men's single sculls, at 09:12.99, improving the previous world record by almost 4 seconds. The victory qualified Polianskyi for participation in the 2020 Tokyo Paralympics.

Polianskyi won the gold medal in PR1 single sculls at the Para Rowing International Regatta in Gavirate, Italy in 2017, and again in 2018.

For his 2016 Paralympic victory, Polianskyi was awarded the Order of Merit, 3-d Class, by the President of Ukraine.

Polianskyi holds the rank of Candidate for Master of Sport of Ukraine.

Notes

References

External links

Athlete profile,  National Sports Committee for the Disabled of Ukraine

Living people
1986 births
Ukrainian male rowers
Rowers at the 2016 Summer Paralympics
Rowers at the 2020 Summer Paralympics
World Rowing Championships medalists for Ukraine
Paralympic gold medalists for Ukraine
Recipients of the Order of Merit (Ukraine), 3rd class
Paralympic medalists in rowing
Medalists at the 2016 Summer Paralympics
Medalists at the 2020 Summer Paralympics
Paralympic rowers of Ukraine
Sportspeople from Donetsk Oblast